Wye railway station serves Wye in Kent, England, on the Ashford to Ramsgate line. The station and all trains that serve the station are operated by Southeastern.

History
The first plan for a station near Wye was in 1812, when John Rennie the Elder proposed building a canal to connect the River Medway in North Kent with the River Rother in East Sussex. A tramway would connect Wye to the canal. The proposal was abandoned in favour of through railways.

It was a constructed next to a level crossing with the main road, on the grounds that Parliament believed trains would not be frequent. A crane for goods traffic was installed in 1852. The station began serving local gravel goods traffic in 1919. Freight facilities were closed on 10 June 1963.

Racecourse station
On the opposite side of the level crossing a separate station was opened in March 1882 to serve the racecourse. It was closed in May 1974 (with the last horse racing meeting) and subsequently demolished.

Facilities
The platforms were connected by a concrete footbridge in 1960. This was replaced with a  steel footbridge in 2015.  The staffed level crossing at the south end of the station required manual operation of the gates and was formerly a local traffic bottleneck but was replaced with automated crossing gates in December 2022.

The station is staffed for part of the day. There is a passenger-operated ticket machine located on the Ashford-bound platform, by the footbridge.

The station buildings on the Ashford-bound platform contain the booking office. There is a shelter on the Canterbury-bound platform.

Services 
All services at Wye are operated by Southeastern using  EMUs.

The typical off-peak service in trains per hour is:
 1 tph to London Charing Cross via 
 1 tph to 

During the peak hours, the station is also served by trains to London Cannon Street.

The station is also served by a single early morning service to London St Pancras International, operated by a  EMU.

References
Citations

Sources

External links 

Railway stations in Kent
DfT Category E stations
Transport in the Borough of Ashford
Former South Eastern Railway (UK) stations
Railway stations in Great Britain opened in 1846
Railway stations served by Southeastern